Kyle Swan (born 28 March 1999) is an Australian racewalking athlete. He qualified to represent Australia at the 2020 Summer Olympics in Tokyo 2021, competing in men's 20 kilometres walk. Swan managed to finish the race. He came 36th with a time of 1:27.55., nearly 4 minutes off his PB This was 6:50 behind the eventual winner Massimo Stano of Italy.

Early years 
When Swan was only 6 years old he started watching his brother at Little Athletics. He joined and found that he ran the 800m easily. (This was the longest distance for children of his age). His first coach was Fran Attard. He made his junior international debut aged 16 at the 2015 World Youth (U18) Championships.

Achievements 
In 2018, Swan was the first Aussie across the line in 10th place in the  junior event at the World Race Walking Cup in China. Swan helped Australia to bronze in the team event. Two months later he competed in the World U20 Championships in Finland where he came sixth in a time of 41:24.12.

As a senior athlete Swan now needed to race over twice the distance, 20 km, and it took some time to adjust. By December, 2019 he managed a 1:23.53. In 2021 he set track best times over 5000m and 10,000m and had two solid walks just outside his 20 km PB, allowing him to qualify for the Tokyo 2020 Olympics.

References

External links
 

1999 births
Living people
Australian male racewalkers
Athletes (track and field) at the 2020 Summer Olympics
Olympic athletes of Australia
20th-century Australian people
21st-century Australian people